Zhang Wenmu (Chinese: 张文木) is a Chinese geopolitician and strategist. Zhang is currently a professor at the Center for Strategic Studies at Beijing University of Aeronautics and Astronautics, an executive director of the World Socialism Research Center of the Chinese Academy of Social Sciences, and a director of the China Pacific Society. He is a columnist for Chinese left-wing or nationalist websites such as Utopia, Red Song Society and Guancha. Zhang has a nationalistic political orientation. He is known as China's "hawkish scholar" because he believes that China should continue Mao's ideas in its strategy. Because of his views on maritime power, The National Interest called him one of China's first "navalists". Zhang is regarded as China's leading advocates of the theories of the American strategist Alfred Thayer Mahan.

Monographs 

On China's Maritime Power (2009)

National Strategic Capabilities and the Great Power Game (2012)

India and the Indian Ocean: A Chinese Geopolitical Perspective (2015)

Chinese Geopolitical Theories (2015)

The Impact of the Rise of Christianity and Buddhism on the Competitiveness of the Eurasian Region (2015)

Revisiting Maoist Strategic Thought (2016)

Climate Change and the Fate of China (2017)

References

Geopoliticians
Political realists
Chinese Maoists
Year of birth missing (living people)
Living people
Chinese Academy of Social Sciences
Academic staff of Beihang University